Sporadotrichida is an order of ciliates in the subclass Stichotrichia.

References

External links 

Spirotrichea
Ciliate orders